Austrorossia mastigophora is a species of bobtail squid native to western, southern and eastern Africa, from Guinea and Somalia to the Cape of Good Hope. A doubtful record of this species exists from Chile. It lives at depths to approximately 640 m.

On average, females are larger than males; they grow to 46 mm and 31 mm in mantle length, respectively.

The type specimen was collected in the Indian Ocean near the east African coast by the Valdivia Expedition and the species was described by the leader of that expedition, Carl Chun, the description being published in 1915. It is deposited in the Zoological Collection of the Natural History Museum, Berlin.

References

External links 

Bobtail squid
Molluscs described in 1915
Taxa named by Carl Chun